The 2009–10 North West Counties Football League season (known as the 2009–10 Vodkat League for sponsorship reasons) was the 28th in the history of the North West Counties Football League, a football competition in England. Teams were divided into two divisions the Premier Division and Division One.

Premier Division 

The Premier Division featured two new teams:

 Bootle promoted as champions of Division One
 Padiham promoted as runners-up of Division One

League table

Division One 

Division One featured two new teams:

 Atherton Collieries relegated from the Premier Division
 Barnoldswick Town  promoted from the West Lancashire League

Oldham Town changed their name mid-season to Oldham Boro

League table

References

External links 
 NWCFL Official Site

North West Counties Football League seasons
9